A special election was held in  on October 10, 1826, the same day as the general elections for the 20th Congress, to fill a vacancy caused by the resignation of David Jennings (A) on May 25, 1826.

Election returns

Shannon took his seat on December 4, 1826, and served only for the remainder of the 19th Congress.  He did not run in the general election for the 20th Congress.

See also
List of special elections to the United States House of Representatives
 1826 United States House of Representatives elections in Ohio

References

Ohio 1826 10
Ohio 1826 10
1826 10
Ohio 10
United States House of Representatives 10
United States House of Representatives 1826 10
October 1826 events